Quay Street is a street in the city centre of Manchester, England. The street, designated the A34, continues Peter Street westwards towards the River Irwell and Salford. It is the northern boundary of Spinningfields, the city's business district and Castlefield, the historical area of the city, lies to the south. Quay Street was created in the 18th century for access to a quay on the river and is lined by several listed buildings.

Edward Byrom built a quay on the River Irwell in the 1730s and the street was built to link it to Deansgate which was then known as Aldport Lane. In 1794, it was extended eastwards to Mosley Street. Richard Cobden's red brick townhouse, built in the Georgian style was the first home of Owens College and afterwards Manchester County Court. It is a Grade II* listed building. In the 1840s Harry Stokes ran a beerhouse at numbers 3 - 5 Quay Street. The Hospital for Skin Diseases was in Quay Street. The Opera House, formerly the New Theatre, was built in 1912 by Albert Richardson and Charles Lovett Gill with Farquarson in the Classical style. 

Architect Joseph Sunlight built the Grade II* listed Sunlight House. He had planned to build the Quay Street Tower, a  highrise art deco building behind Sunlight House but was refused planning permission. Had it been built, it would have been not only Manchester's tallest building, but the tallest in Europe.

The street is known for Granada Studios, the UK's first purpose-built television studios and home to Granada Television. The building was designed by architect Ralph Tubbs and was an early example of a building constructed using the curtain wall method. In September 2010, the red 'Granada TV' sign was removed from the building as it was extensively corroded.

See also
List of notable streets and roads in Manchester

References

External links

 Manchester Directory

Streets in Manchester
Shopping streets in Manchester
Tourist attractions in Manchester